The following is the discography of American soul/R&B group Tony! Toni! Toné!.

Albums

Studio albums

Compilation albums

Singles

As lead artist

Notes

As featured artist

References

External links
 

Tony! Toni! Toné!
Discographies of American artists
Rhythm and blues discographies